Périer may refer to :
 Le Périer, a town and commune in the Isère département, in France

People with the surname
 Albert James Perier (1870–1964) Australian photographer
 Antoine-Alexis Perier de Salvert (1691–1759) French naval officer
 Bonaventure des Périers (c. 1501–1544), French author
 Casimir Pierre Périer (1777–1832), French entrepreneur and politician
 Claude Perier (1742–1801), wealthy bourgeois, father of Casimir Pierre Perier, owner of Vizille chateau
 Étienne Perier (governor), the fifth governor of the Louisiana colony
 Étienne Périer (director) (born 1931), Belgian film director
 Florin Périer, husband of Blaise Pascal's elder sister Gilberte
 François Périer (1919–2002), French actor
 Jean-Marie Périer (born 1940), French photographer
 Marguerite Périer (1646–1733), French nun and follower of Jansenism
 René de Saint-Périer (1877–1950), French prehistorian, discoverer of the Venus of Lespugue in 1922

See also
 Casimir-Perier (surname)
 Périers (disambiguation), various meanings, including use as a surname
 Perrier (disambiguation)

French-language surnames